The Ljubljana Gap, less often the Ljubljana Gate, is a geographical term for 
the transition area between the Alps and Dinaric Alps that passes from southwest to northeast between Trieste and Ljubljana.

A strategically-vital mountain pass in Europe, it is named after Ljubljana, the capital city of Slovenia.

References

Mountain passes of the Alps